Rank is the only standalone official live album by English band the Smiths. It was released a year after the band’s breakup, in September 1988, by their British record company Rough Trade, and reached No. 2 in the British charts. In the United States, the album was released on Sire Records and made No. 77.

Background
Rank was released as a contractual obligation. It was recorded almost two years earlier on 23 October 1986 at National Ballroom in Kilburn, London, and is a fourteen-track distillation (of 21 songs) by singer Morrissey from the complete concert recording that had earlier been transmitted by BBC Radio 1. The album rode high on the Smiths nostalgia and the success of Morrissey's debut solo album, Viva Hate, earlier the same year.

The songs omitted from the recording of the Kilburn show are: "I Want the One I Can't Have", "There Is a Light That Never Goes Out", "Frankly, Mr. Shankly", "Never Had No One Ever", "Meat Is Murder", and "How Soon Is Now?" Also, some edits can be readily heard in the concert itself, such as at the end of "I Know It's Over" when the crowd starts cheering. In late 2008 video footage appeared from the show on YouTube.

According to the Smiths biographers Johnny Rogan and David Bret, Morrissey originally titled the album The Smiths in Heat. Rough Trade objected and Morrissey proposed Rank, "as in 'J. Arthur'" (J. Arthur Rank is Cockney rhyming slang for "wank").

Packaging
The album cover for Rank, designed by Morrissey, is a photo of actress Alexandra Bastedo. The image is from photographer John D. Green's 1967 book Birds of Britain. The gatefold album's interior features a photo of several Smiths fans ripping apart Morrissey's shirt. That picture was taken by Ian Tilton at the 1986 Factory Records "Festival of the Tenth Summer" concert at G-Mex Centre in Manchester, England.

Track listing
All tracks written by Johnny Marr and Morrissey except "His Latest Flame" (Doc Pomus, Mort Shuman), "The Draize Train" (Marr) and the very beginning of "The Queen Is Dead" where an audio recording of Sergei Prokofiev's classical piece "Montagues and Capulets" was played to introduce the band.

Charts

Personnel

The band
 Morrissey – vocals
 Johnny Marr – lead guitar
 Andy Rourke – bass guitar
 Mike Joyce – drums
 Craig Gannon – rhythm guitar

Technical staff
 Pete Dauncey and Grant Showbiz – producers
 Paul Nickson – engineer

References

The Smiths live albums
Albums produced by Grant Showbiz
1988 live albums
Rough Trade Records live albums
Sire Records live albums